The Komunarskyi District is one of seven administrative urban districts (raions) of the city of Zaporizhzhia, located in southern Ukraine. Its population was 139,222 in the 2001 Ukrainian Census, and 134,465 .

The raion contains the informal Pivdennyi (Southern) and Kosmichnyi (Cosmic) residential neighborhoods within its boundaries.

Geography
The Komunarskyi District is named after the former Komunar factory (currently, the Zaporizhzhia Automobile Building Plant) which is located within the district's boundaries. The district is located in the southeastern portion of the city, on the left-bank of the Dnipro River, just north of the urban-type settlement of Balabyne, Zaporizhzhia Oblast.

History
On 6 April 1977, the Komunarskyi District was established out of a portion of the Zhovtnevyi District by a decree of the Presidium of the Verkhovna Rada of the Ukrainian Soviet Socialist Republic (No.1901-ІХ).

References

External links
 
 

Urban districts of Zaporizhzhia
States and territories established in 1977
1977 establishments in Ukraine